The Eid Fjord is the innermost part of the Hardanger Fjord in Norway. It extends  eastwards from the Utne Fjord and Sørfjorden. The Eid Fjord lies in the municipalities of Ullensvang, Ulvik, and Eidfjord in Vestland county.

The inner part of the ford is called the Simadal Fjord. The villages of Ringøy and Bjotveit lie on the south side of the fjord, and Djønno lies on the north side. Further into the fjord, village on the north side include Vangsbygdi and, to the east, Bruravik. From Bruravik there was a ferry connection to Brimnes on the south side of the fjord. This ferry was part of the route between Bergen and Oslo across the Hardangervidda Plateau on Norwegian National Road 7. In 2013 the ferry connection was replaced by the Hardanger Bridge. At Bruravik the Osa Fjord extends to the northeast. The outermost part of the Osa Fjord is also known as the Bagns Fjord. Deeper into the fjord, it makes a strong turn, first to the north and then to the south, where the village of Eidfjord is located. The Simadal Fjord extends from Eidfjord, constituting the last  of the Hardanger Fjord.

References

Fjords of Vestland
Ullensvang
Eidfjord
Ulvik